The submandibular triangle (or submaxillary  or digastric triangle) corresponds to the region of the neck immediately beneath the body of the mandible.

Boundaries and coverings
It is bounded:
 above, by the lower border of the body of the mandible, and a line drawn from its angle to the mastoid process; 
 below, by the posterior belly of the Digastricus; in front, by the anterior belly of the Digastricus.

It is covered by the integument, superficial fascia, Platysma, and deep fascia, ramifying in which are branches of the facial nerve and ascending filaments of the cutaneous cervical nerve.

Its floor is formed by the Mylohyoideus anteriorly, and by the hyoglossus posteriorly.

Triangles
Beclard Triangle
Lesser Triangle
Pirogoff Triangle

Divisions
It is divided into an anterior and a posterior part by the stylomandibular ligament.

Anterior part
The anterior part contains the submandibular gland, superficial to which is the anterior facial vein, while imbedded in the gland is the facial artery and its glandular branches.

Beneath the gland, on the surface of the Mylohyoideus, are the submental artery and the mylohyoid artery and nerve.

Posterior part
The posterior part of this triangle contains the external carotid artery, ascending deeply in the substance of the parotid gland

This vessel lies here in front of, and superficial to, the external carotid, being crossed by the facial nerve, and gives off in its course the posterior auricular, superficial temporal, and internal maxillary branches: more deeply are the internal carotid, the internal jugular vein, and the vagus nerve, separated from the external carotid by the Styloglossus and Stylopharyngeus, and the hypoglossal nerve

See also
 Anterior triangle of the neck
 Submandibular space

Additional images

Summary of contents
The following summarizes the important structures found in the submandibular triangle:
 1. The external and internal carotid artery
 2. The internal jugular vein
 3. The deep cervical lymph nodes
 4. The 10th cranial nerve ( Vagus Nerve )
 5. The submandibular gland
 6. The submandibular lymph nodes
 7. The Facial artery and vein
 8. The 12th cranial nerve ( Hypoglossal Nerve )

References

External links
 
 
 
 
 Overview at bcm.edu
 Overview at howard.edu

Human head and neck
Triangles of the neck